Snake River High School is a high school near Blackfoot, Idaho. The school has an enrollment of 553 (2018–19) and Ray Carter is the principal.

References

External links 
 
 2019 Ranking at usnews.com

Schools in Bingham County, Idaho
Educational institutions in the United States with year of establishment missing
Public high schools in Idaho
Blackfoot, Idaho